The Metsähovi Radio Observatory is an astronomical observatory in Finland, affiliated with the Aalto University. Its main premises are in Metsähovi, Kirkkonummi, 35 kilometers west of the university's Otaniemi campus.

The observatory currently operates a  diameter radio telescope, and has an array of four  dishes to serve as a compact interferometer called the 'Metsähovi Compact Array', as well as several smaller radio telescopes and instruments. The observatory is staffed by some 20 researchers, engineers, and students, mostly from Aalto University and the Finnish Centre for Astronomy with the ESO.

The observatory has been operational since 1974 and active in the fields of:
Fundamental research in radio astronomy 
Development of instruments needed in radio astronomy 
Development of methods for radio astronomical measurements
Applied scientific computing
Space research 
Education

The current research focuses on variable quasars, active galaxies, solar observations, and very long baseline interferometry. Metsähovi is as a member of the European VLBI Network.

The observatory observed the near-total Solar eclipse of March 20, 2015 at 11.2 and 37 GHz.

See also 
 List of astronomical observatories
 List of radio telescopes

References

External links 
 Metsähovi Radio Observatory

Astronomical observatories in Finland